Abronia moreletii, commonly known as Morelet's alligator lizard, is a species of lizard in the family Anguidae. The species is endemic to Central America.

Etymology
The specific name, moreletii, is in honor of French naturalist Pierre Marie Arthur Morelet.

Geographic range
A. moreletii is native to southern Mexico, Guatemala, Honduras, El Salvador, and Nicaragua.

Habitat

Subspecies
The following subspecies are recognized as being valid:
Abronia moreletii moreletii 
Abronia moreletii rafaeli 
Abronia moreletii salvadorensis 
Abronia moreletii temporalis 

Nota bene: A trinomial authority in parentheses indicates that the subspecies was originally described in a genus other than Abronia.

The subspecific name, rafaeli, is in honor of Mexican herpetologist Rafael Martín del Campo.

References

Further reading
Bocourt MF ("1871", 1872). "Description de quelques Gerrhonotes nouveaux provenant du Mexique et de l'Amérique centrale ". Nouvelles Archives du Muséum d'Histoire Naturelle de Paris 7 (4): 101-108. ("Gerrhonotus moreleti [sic], n. sp.", new species, p. 102; "Gerrh. moreletii [sic]", pp. 103–104). (in French).

Abronia
Lizards of Central America
Reptiles of El Salvador
Reptiles of Guatemala
Reptiles of Honduras
Reptiles of Mexico
Reptiles of Nicaragua
Reptiles described in 1872
Taxa named by Marie Firmin Bocourt
Taxobox binomials not recognized by IUCN